Rabdophaga repenticornua is a gall midge which forms galls on the buds of creeping willow (Salix repens).

Description
The female fly lays an egg in the bud of Salix repens. The solitary, orange larva feeds within the bud which grows into a 13 mm long, horn-like, reddish tube which tapers to the tip. Development of the larva probably takes two  years.

Distribution
The gall has been found in Scotland.

References

repenticornua
Nematoceran flies of Europe
Gall-inducing insects
Insects described in 2001
Willow galls